Johnson Tam is the executive producer of the Philippine television program Reporter's Notebook. He is a Filipino documentary producer who works for the Philippine television network GMA News and Public Affairs. He produced the documentary Pinoy Exodus sa Lebanon which was awarded the Best Current Affairs Program at the 2008 Asian Television Awards.

References 

Living people
Filipino television personalities
Year of birth missing (living people)